Mahdi Ben Slimane (born 1 January 1974) is a Tunisian former professional footballer who played as a forward.

Having begun his career at AS Marsa in his native country he moved to France in 1996 to play for Olympique de Marseille. After just one season at the club, he joined 2. Bundesliga side SC Freiburg whom helped to promotion to the Bundesliga. He spent half a season on loan each at Borussia Mönchengladbach (in 2000) and club Al-Nassr (in 2001) before leaving Freiburg and returning to Tunisia, where he spent a season and half at Club Africain.

At international level, he played for the Tunisia national team and was a member of squad at the 1998 FIFA World Cup, the 1996 African Cup of Nations, and the 1998 African Cup of Nations.

Club career
In February 2000, Ben Slimane scored a brace for SC Freiburg contributing to 2–0 win against SSV Ulm.

International career
Ben Slimane participated at the 1998 African Cup of Nations scoring twice for the Tunisia national team, one goal each against DR Congo on 12 February and against Togo on 16 February.

Together with Freiburg teammate Zoubeir Baya, he represented his country at the 1998 FIFA World Cup.

Career statistics
Scores and results list Tunisia's goal tally first, score column indicates score after each Ben Slimane goal.

References

1973 births
Living people
Association football forwards
Tunisian footballers
Tunisian expatriate footballers
AS Marsa players
Olympique de Marseille players
SC Freiburg players
Borussia Mönchengladbach players
Al Nassr FC players
Club Africain players
Tunisian Ligue Professionnelle 1 players
Ligue 1 players
Bundesliga players
2. Bundesliga players
Saudi Professional League players
Footballers at the 1996 Summer Olympics
Olympic footballers of Tunisia
Tunisia international footballers
1998 FIFA World Cup players
1996 African Cup of Nations players
1998 African Cup of Nations players
Expatriate footballers in France
Expatriate footballers in Germany
Expatriate footballers in Saudi Arabia
Tunisian expatriate sportspeople in France 
Tunisian expatriate sportspeople in Germany 
Tunisian expatriate sportspeople in Saudi Arabia